WBKV may refer to:

 WBKV (FM), a radio station (88.9 FM) licensed to serve Buffalo, New York, United States
 WLFM (FM), a radio station (103.9 FM) licensed to serve Lawrenceburg, Tennessee, United States, which held the call sign WBKV from 2018 to 2019
 WIBD, a radio station (1470 AM) licensed to serve West Bend, Wisconsin, United States, which held the call sign WBKV from 1950 to 2016